A split decision (SD) is a winning criterion in boxing, most commonly in full-contact combat sports, in which two of the three judges score one particular competitor as the winner, while the third judge scores for the other competitor.

A split decision is different from a majority decision. A majority decision occurs when two judges pick the same competitor as the winner, and the third judge scores the contest a draw (tie). The official result remains the same in both split and majority decisions, but the margin of victory is greater in a majority decision and less in a split decision.

Occasionally, the judges' final decision is a tie, because the first judge scores for one competitor, the second one scores for the other competitor, and the third judge scores the contest a draw (tie); so in this case the official result is a split draw.

Often, a split decision causes controversy due to its lack of unanimity. As a result, especially in high-profile or title fights, the victor may be encouraged or pressured to grant a rematch, in the hopes a return match-up will have a more decisive outcome.

Notable examples from boxing

Outside of boxing
In the Philippines, the term "split decision" is also used on GMA Network's reality television show The Clash, when two of the three members of the clash panel (Ai-Ai delas Alas, Christian Bautista, and Lani Misalucha) chose a clasher (among two) to advance to the next round, while the other clasher is eliminated. An example of it that Golden Cañedo won the clash against Fatima Espiritu via split decision. Cañedo was later the Clash grand winner of the show's first season.

See also

10 Point System

References

Split Decision